Hertling is a surname. Notable people with the surname include:

Franz Xaver von Hertling (1780–1844), Bavarian Lieutenant General and War Minister
Friedrich von Hertling (1781–1850), Bavarian Lieutenant General and Acting War Minister
Franz Xaver Freiherr von Hertling (1780-1844), Bavarian lieutenant general and War Minister
Georg von Hertling (1843–1919), Bavarian politician, Prime Minister of Bavaria and then of Prussia, and Chancellor of the German Empire
Knud Ludvig Johannes Hertling (1925-2010), Greenlandic-Danish politician 
Mark Hertling (born 1953), United States Army general
Nele Hertling (born 1934), German theatre manager and promoter of innovative culture
Richard Hertling (born 1960), Acting United States Assistant Attorney General
William Hertling (born 1970), American science fiction writer and programmer